Whiteavesia is an extinct genus of fossil bivalve mollusks from the Late Ordovician of North and South America.

References

Further reading 
 Fossils (Smithsonian Handbooks) by David Ward (Page 103)

Modiomorphidae
Ordovician bivalves
Prehistoric bivalves of North America
Ordovician animals of South America
Ordovician Argentina
Fossils of Argentina
Paleozoic life of Nunavut
Prehistoric bivalve genera